J7, J07, J 7 or J-7 may refer to:
 ATC code J07 Vaccines, a subgroup of the Anatomical Therapeutic Chemical Classification System
 Chengdu J-7, a 1966 People's Republic of China-built fighter jet
 County Route J7 (California)
 Demolition Plot J-7, a 1989 extended play from the American indie rock band Pavement
 , an Australian submarine
 , a 1939 British Royal Navy 
 Johnson solid J7, the elongated triangular pyramid
 Junkers J 7, another designation for the German Junkers D.I aircraft
 LNER Class J7, a class of British steam locomotives
 Peugeot J7, a midsize van manufactured between 1965 and 1980
 Kyushu J7, a Japanese Kyushu-Watanabe prototype fighter aircraft
 Malaysia Federal Route J7, a major road in Johor, Malaysia
 Samsung Galaxy J7, an Android mid-range smartphone

and also:
 Centre-Avia IATA code
 ValuJet Airlines IATA code
 A brand of fruit juice produced by Wimm-Bill-Dann Foods in Russia